Louisiana Highway 44 (LA 44) is a state highway in Louisiana that serves Ascension, St. James, and St. John the Baptist Parishes. It runs from west to east, parallel to the east bank of the Mississippi River, from Prairieville to LaPlace. Throughout its run, LA 44 is known as North/South Burnside Avenue, River Road, West/East Jefferson Highway, West 5th Street, and Main Street.

Route description
From the west, LA 44 begins at an intersection with LA 42 (Oak Grove-Port Vincent Highway) in Prairieville.  The highway travels south along North Burnside Avenue into Gonzales where it intersects with US 61 (North Airline Highway).  Passing through downtown Gonzales, LA 44 has a brief concurrency with LA 429.  After several blocks, the local name changes to South Burnside Avenue at an intersection with LA 3038 (East Cornerview Street), and LA 429 splits off to the west along West Cornerview Street.  Leaving Gonzales, LA 44 continues south and intersects with I-10.

After three miles, LA 44 intersects with LA 22 as that highway runs between Sorrento and Darrow.  A mile later, LA 44 reaches the east bank of the Mississippi River at an intersection with LA 942 at Burnside.  Here, the route turns onto the River Road and soon crosses from Ascension Parish into St. James Parish.  It then passes under and connects with the Sunshine Bridge, part of LA 70 to Donaldsonville.

Continuing downriver, LA 44 begins to follow a generally eastward direction passing through the communities of Convent, Paulina, Lutcher, and Gramercy.  Jefferson Highway, the local name in use beginning in Lutcher, is a vestige of the road being part of that historic auto trail in the 1910s and 1920s.  On the east side of Gramercy, LA 44 passes under and connects with a second Mississippi River crossing known as the Gramercy Bridge, part of LA 3213, just before entering St. John the Baptist Parish.

Continuing along the Mississippi River, LA 44 runs parallel to US 61 (Airline Highway) and passes through the communities of Mt. Airy, Garyville, Lions, and Reserve.  LA 44 then enters LaPlace, turning away from the river at an intersection with LA 636 onto West 5th Street.  Almost two miles later, LA 44 turns northeast onto Main Street at LA 628.  The route ends at US 61 (West/East Airline Highway) near the southern terminus of US 51.

LA 44 is an undivided, two-lane highway from LA 42 to LA 621 in Gonzales, where it widens into an undivided, four-lane highway.  At LA 30, LA 44 becomes a divided four-lane highway to just south of I-10, where it reverts to an undivided, two-lane highway for the remainder of its route to LaPlace.

History
The portion of LA 44 running along the Mississippi River was once part of the Jefferson Highway auto trail designated in 1916 and the main traffic route between New Orleans and Baton Rouge prior to the construction of the Airline Highway in the 1930s.  In 1921, it became part of State Route 1 in the pre-1955 Louisiana highway system and the original alignment of US 61 in 1926.  US 61 also followed the Gonzales-Burnside section of LA 44 (pre-1955 State Route 88) briefly before being completely removed from the route following the opening of the Airline Highway in 1933.

Major intersections

References

External links

LADOTD Map of Numbered Highways
Louisiana State Highway Log

0044
044
Transportation in Ascension Parish, Louisiana
Transportation in St. James Parish, Louisiana
Transportation in St. John the Baptist Parish, Louisiana